Anhypotrix tristis is a moth of the family Noctuidae first described by William Barnes and James Halliday McDunnough in 1910. It is found from eastern Arizona and northern New Mexico southward in the Sierra Madre Occidental to the state of Durango in Mexico.

The length of the forewings is 15–18 mm and the wingspan is about 30 mm. Adults have been collected in conifer forest habitats from early May until early August.

External links
A revision of the genus Hypotrix Guenée in North America with descriptions of four new species and a new genus (Lepidoptera, Noctuidae, Noctuinae, Eriopygini)

Noctuinae
Moths described in 1910